The 2012–13 Philippine Basketball Association (PBA) Philippine Cup was the first conference of the 2012–13 PBA season. The tournament started on September 30, 2012, and concluded on January 16, 2013. The tournament does not allow teams to hire foreign players or imports.

Format
The following format was observed for the duration of the tournament:
Two-round eliminations, with each team playing 14 games. The teams are divided into two groups on the basis of their natural draft order from the previous rookie draft. Each team will play teams within their group once, while they will play teams from the other group twice.
Group A:
Air21 Express (#1)
Meralco Bolts (#3)
Petron Blaze Boosters (#5)
Barangay Ginebra San Miguel (#7)
San Mig Coffee Mixers (#9)
Group B:
Alaska Aces (#2)
Barako Bull Energy Cola (#4)
GlobalPort Batang Pier (#6)
Rain or Shine Elasto Painters (#8)
Talk 'N Text Tropang Texters (#10)
Top eight teams will advance to the quarterfinals. In case of tie, playoffs will be held only for the #2 and #8 seeds.
Quarterfinals:
QF1: #1 seed vs #8 seed (#1 seed twice-to-beat)
QF2: #2 seed vs #7 seed (#2 seed twice-to-beat)
QF3: #3 seed vs #6 seed (best-of-3 series)
QF4: #4 seed vs #5 seed (best-of-3 series)
Semifinals (best-of-7 series):
SF1: QF1 vs. QF4 winners
SF2: QF2 vs. QF3 winners
Finals (best-of-7 series)
Winners of the semifinals

Elimination round

Team standings

Schedule

Results

Bracket

Quarterfinals

(1) Talk 'N Text vs. (8) Air21

(2) San Mig Coffee vs. (7) Petron Blaze

(3) Rain or Shine vs. (6) Barangay Ginebra

(4) Meralco vs. (5) Alaska

Semifinals

(1) Talk 'N Text vs. (5) Alaska

(2) San Mig Coffee vs. (3) Rain or Shine

Finals

Conference records
Records marked with an asterisk (*) were accomplished with one or more overtime periods.

Team

Individual

Awards

Conference
Best Player of the Conference: Jayson Castro (Talk 'N Text Tropang Texters)
Finals MVP: Ranidel de Ocampo (Talk 'N Text Tropang Texters)

Players of the Week

References

External links
 PBA.ph

PBA Philippine Cup
Philippine Cup